Botad is one of the 182 Legislative Assembly constituencies of Gujarat state in India. It is part of Botad district.

List of segments
This assembly seat represents the following segments,

 Botad Taluka.
 Gadhada Taluka (part) Villages – Dhrufaniya, Hamapar, Ingorala (Khalsa), Janada, Pipaliya, Tatam, Bhimdad, Derala, Ratanvav, Ratanpar, Sakhpar Mota, Gala, Salangpar Nanu, Meghvadiya, Sakhpar Nana, Surka, Ningala, Shiyanagar, Zinzavadar, Ugamedi, Goradka, Holaya, Raypar, Adtala, Pipal, Tatana, Ishvariya, Lakhanka.

Members of Legislative Assembly

Election candidate

2022 
 

<?--
-->

Election results

2017

2012

2007

2002

See also
 List of constituencies of Gujarat Legislative Assembly
 Gujarat Legislative Assembly
 Botad district

References

External links
 

Assembly constituencies of Gujarat
Botad district